Sa'id I ibn Idris (760–803) was emir of Nekor. He moved the capital from Temsaman to Nekor. The city was later was sacked by the Normans, who took many prisoners, a few of whom were ransomed by the Umayyad ruler of Spain. Later, part of the Ghomara tribe revolted, led by a person called Segguen; their revolt was defeated.

Sa'id I ibn Idris is the ancestor of the Berber Jebala people of Tangier, Tétouan and Chefchaouen and his son Salim I ibn Sa'id is the ancestor of the Ait Ouriaghel Berbers of the Rif Mountains and Salim I ibn Sa'id established the Riffian cities of Imzouren and Al-Hoceima.

References

760 births
803 deaths
8th-century Berber people
9th-century Berber people
8th-century rulers in Africa
People from Nekor
Rif